Elizabeth Anne Hull  (January 10, 1937 – August 3, 2021) was an American academic, political activist and science fiction expert.

She was Professor Emerita of William Rainey Harper College in Palatine, Illinois, where she taught English for over 30 years. She was born in Upper Darby, Pennsylvania, and  educated at Illinois State University (1954–55); City Colleges of Chicago (A.A., 1965); Northwestern University and Loyola University (M.A., 1970, Ph.D., 1975).

In 1993, Hull was regional judge for the National Council of Teachers of English Achievement Awards in Writing.

Science fiction

She has served as president of the Science Fiction Research Association and editor of its newsletter. SFRA awarded her the Thomas D. Clareson Award for Distinguished Service in 1997, and she has been a member of the panel for the John W. Campbell Memorial Award for best SF novel since 1986. For over ten years, she served as North American secretary for the World SF International Organization for Professionals.

With her husband Frederik Pohl, Hull edited the international anthology Tales from the Planet Earth. She is editor of the 2010 anthology, Gateways: Original New Stories Inspired by Frederik Pohl.

Public service
In 1996, Hull, a former president of the Palatine Area League of Women Voters, was selected by the Democratic Party as its nominee against longtime Republican Congressman Phil Crane in Illinois's 8th congressional district; however, Crane was reelected.

Personal life
Hull and Pohl married in 1984. He had been married and divorced four times. "From her previous marriage, she has two daughters, Catherine Pizarro and Barbara Wintczak, and two grandchildren, Christine and Eric Wintczak."

References

Who's Who in America

External links

 

1937 births
2021 deaths
American book editors
Science fiction editors
Illinois Democrats
Women in Illinois politics
Illinois State University alumni
People from Upper Darby Township, Pennsylvania